Jiří Novák and David Rikl were the defending champions but lost in the semifinals to Ellis Ferreira and Jeff Tarango.

Max Mirnyi and Sandon Stolle won in the final 7–6(7–0), 7–6(7–4) against Ferreira and Tarango.

Seeds
All seeds receive a bye into the second round.

Draw

Finals

Top half

Bottom half

References
General

Men's Doubles
Stuttgart Masters Doubles